Houstonia procumbens, the roundleaf bluet, is a perennial species in the family Rubiaceae. It is native to the southeastern United States: Louisiana, Mississippi, Alabama, Georgia, Florida and South Carolina. Its native habitats include disturbed sites, and moist, open, sandy areas. Flowers bloom March to October.

References

procumbens
Endemic flora of the United States
Flora of the Southeastern United States
Plants described in 1918
Flora without expected TNC conservation status